The discography of The Knockouts, a Swedish rock group, consists of four studio albums, five singles, one extended plays (EPs)  and two compilation albums.

The Knockouts are a Swedish rock band from Stockholm, Sweden, formed in 1996.

The current lineup consists of Johan Frandsen (vocals, guitar), Kennet Stone (double bass, vocals) and Ted Jergelind, (drums).  The band has risen to fame in 2010 after the release of the album Among the Vultures.

Formed by Johan Frandsen, The Knockouts first exposure came from the release of their 1998 self-titled debut 7 inch single The Knockouts, produced by Thomas Skogsberg, (The Hellacopters)

1999 to 2001 was spent touring, writing and preparing to record the full length promotional album Skyline Supernova, recorded in Sunlight Studio, Sweden and released in summer 2000, and various compilation recordings, including A Fistfull of Rock, Devil Doll Records. The success of their album scored them national support and the slot on the Hultsfred Festival, playing in the same year as bands such as Iggy Pop and Rocket from the Crypt.

After devouring two years' worth of gigs, and with a different way of looking at the Swedish punk rock scene, and following from the success of Skyline Supernova, in 2003 the trio went on to solidify its sound and early 2004 saw them head into the studio and record the 4-track EP self-titled The Knockouts.

While writing new material during 2004–2006 for their second full-length album and touring Sweden, Germany, Spain, Johan Frandsen (lead vocals, guitar) toured over 300 dates with internationally respected Swedish rockabilly band, The GoGetters.

In the midst of a relentless touring schedule between 2006 and 2008, new songs were bubbling to the surface in what would become El Fin De La Guerra. Recorded October 2007 and released Feb 1, 2008 this new album saw the band fly into a massive Europe and USA tour including planned dates in Sweden, Germany, Czech Republic, Finland, and the West Coast of the United States.

The band's big break came in 2009 with the release of the award-winning album Among the Vultures. This full-length album from  The Knockouts was nominated for Best Punk Rock Album at the 2011 Independent Music Awards, and two singles from the album were nominated for best punk song "Heat for the Hunted" and best alternative country song "Ever Been Hurt".

The Knockouts added BEST Punk Rock Album to their collection as voted by the industry panel including Joe Perry of Aerosmith, Benji Madden and Joel Madden, Good Charlotte, and Ozzy Osbourne.  One of the singles, "Heat for the Hunted", from the album Among the Vultures was chosen 3rd on Sweden's National Radio Program Håkan Persson's Sveriges Radio P3 as the best top ten songs for 2009.

Among the Vultures, was recorded and produced in six days at The Panic Room, Skara, Sweden.  This full-length album is receiving multiple accolades and reviews

The official single, "Under the Light" has attracted radio play and reviews both in Scandinavia, USA and Europe.

2012 to 2013 saw the band working on the newest album. 5000 Miles From Louisville, was recorded and mixed in ten days in February 2013 at Park Studio Stockholm, Sweden.  It was produced by Stefan Boman, of Park Studio (owned by World-famous Swedish Band Kent) and Johan Frandsen of The Knockouts. This full-length album is receiving radio plays and reviews;

... the catchiness of the beats and melodies grab you, the lyrics hold on tight and refuse to let you go ...

The official single, ...'Days Long Gone' hurtles out of the speakers with a confidence and energy that tells me everything I need to know about this record and that is it's going to compete and there's a strength in the outstanding playing and songwriting that places this Scandinavian three piece right at the top of the pack...

The albums also featured Kevin McKendree on piano on the song “Stars of Us”.

Recent activity
In 2013 and 2014, The Knockouts have worked to rehearse, record and release the newest studio album ‘’’5000 Miles from Louisville’’, having signed with Swedish Booking Agency MTA Production AB, The Knockouts are back on the road and hitting stages throughout Scandinavia with the newest release in their usual high energy gigs!

2012 saw The Knockouts working on new material for the upcoming album, during this time, illness within the band meant that touring schedules were kept to a minimum and work was directed to the songs for the new release (Due early 2013). A special event was held in September 2012 at Debaser Slussen Stockholm, Sweden. Slim Jim Phantom from the world famous Stray Cats and Jonny Bowler from the Guana Batz flew from Los Angeles to join The Knockouts on stage in a once only special event to a soldout show, celebrating Johan Frandsen's 30th birthday.

In 2011 The Knockouts supported rock and roll icon and Stray Cats front man Brian Setzer, on the Brian Setzer's Rockabilly Riot tour 2011

They started the European summer with a performance with Brian Sezter on the premiere night of his tour at the 10 year celebration of the Azkena Rock Festival on the June 25, Vitoria-Gasteiz, Spain to crowds of over 50,000 people, then onto sold out dates throughout Germany in Berlin, Hamburg and Cologne. The tour continued to be sold out through Scandinavia with dates in Copenhagen, Denmark, Stockholm, Sweden and Helsinki, Finland ending at the Helsinki Ice Hall (Venue Capacity of 8200) in Helsinki.
 
Highlight of the tour was the encore performance at the Helsinki Ice Hall on the last night of the tour when The Knockouts frontman Johan Frandsen joined Brian Setzer] and Slim Jim Phantom on stage with a special rendition of the rockabilly classic, "Seven Nights to Rock". Setzer called Frandsen to the stage and handed his white Brian Setzer Hot Rod signature Gretsch Guitar to Johan to conclude the tour in Scandinavia.

The Knockouts' tours have included dates throughout Europe including countries such as, Sweden, Finland, Denmark, Germany, Finland, Czech Republic and Spain.

They have played at festivals such as the West Coast Riot and The Peace and Love Festival, alongside Brian Setzer, Social Distortion and The Living End. They supported The Living End in 2009 on their first Scandinavian tour date for the Raise the Alarm World Tour – in Stockholm.

Studio albums

Extended plays

Singles

Compilations

References

External links
 The Knockouts official website
 The Knockouts support Brian Setzer's Rockabilly Riot

Rock music group discographies
Discographies of Swedish artists